Sean Burrell (born February 23, 2002) is an American athlete who has competed in the 200m, 400m and 400m hurdles.

Career
A native of Zachary, Louisiana, Burrell competes at the collegiate level for the LSU Tigers. He ran 47.85 for the 400m hurdles to win the 2021 NCAA Division I Outdoor Track and Field Championships at Hayward Field, Eugene, Oregon which made him the junior world record holder in that event, beating the record which had been set by Danny Harris in 1984. At the time of the race, the fourth fastest time recorded by anyone in the world that year, and was ultimately the seventh fastest time of 2021.

Personal life
His father Keltrin Burrell Sr. and mother Jacqueline Burrell were high school runners. His brother Jon Burrell competed in the throwing of the javelin at Zachary High School and Louisiana Tech University.

References

External links
 LSU Tigers bio

2002 births
Living people
American male sprinters
American male hurdlers
LSU Tigers track and field athletes
People from Zachary, Louisiana
African-American track and field athletes
Track and field athletes from Louisiana
21st-century African-American sportspeople
Sportspeople from East Baton Rouge Parish, Louisiana